The Singapore Indian Orchestra & Choir (SIOC) is an orchestra with a companion choir established by the People's Association. in 1985 in Singapore. They have staged over 350 performances and are regularly invited to perform at local concerts of festivals in Singapore, Australia and Brunei.

History
Since its inception, SIOC has been run by Lalitha Vaidyanathan. The SIOC Youth wing is run by Vicknesvari Vadivalagan.

The orchestra consist of music students from various art schools and organizations.

Conductor 
 Lalitha Vaidyanathan

References

Singaporean choirs
Singaporean orchestras
Indian orchestras